The Long Range Mountains are a series of mountains along the west coast of the Canadian island of Newfoundland. The long range mountains form the northernmost section of the Appalachian mountain chain on the eastern seaboard of North America.  

In 2003, it was announced that the International Appalachian Trail would be extended through the Long Range Mountains. A portion of the trail opened in 2006.

Description

The Great Northern Peninsula of Western Newfoundland contains the Highlands, the largest external basement massif of the Grenville Orogeny in the Appalachian Orogen.  This Precambrian basement is known as the Long Range Inlier, Long Range Complex or Basement Gneiss Complex, consisting of quartz-feldspar gneisses and granites that are up to 1,550 million years in age. The Long Range dikes are mafic in composition and have an age of about 605 million years. 

Running along the Gulf of St. Lawrence, the range includes the following sections:

 Anguille Mountains,
 Lewis Hills,
 Tablelands (a section of the Earth's mantle exposed at the surface)
 main section of the Long Range Mountains (running northeast from the Tablelands through Gros Morne National Park)

See also 
 Avalonia

References

Mountain ranges of Newfoundland and Labrador
Subranges of the Appalachian Mountains